Quinto Martini may refer to:

Quinto Martini (artist) (1908–1990), Italian artist and writer
Quinto Martini (politician) (1908–1975), Canadian politician